The Muga is a river in Catalonia, Spain, that rises in the Alberes mountains of the eastern Pyrenees and enters the Mediterranean Sea at the Gulf of Roses.

Its source is below the summit of Montnegre, elevation . The river passes through the village of Pont de Molins and passes through the Boadella Reservoir, where the river is dammed.

The Muga Valley was entrusted to the  County of Empúries by Ramon Berenguer III after being in the County of Besalú.  The local population suffered in both the Peninsular War and Spanish Civil War.

See also 
 List of rivers of Spain

References 

Rivers of Spain
Rivers of Catalonia